Zonda Home provides data and publications relating to commercial property and home construction in North America. The company's publications include Architect, the official magazine of the American Institute of Architects, Builder, the official magazine of the National Association of Builders (NAHB), Pool & Spa News,  Journal of Light Construction, Affordable Housing Finance, and Multifamily Executive.

History
The company was founded as Hanley Wood by Michael M. Wood and Michael J. Hanley in 1976. In August 2005, the company was sold to JPMorgan Partners (now CCMP Capital) and Wood resigned.

In January 2013, the company acquired Metrostudy.

In December 2018, the company was acquired by MidOcean Partners and merged with Meyers Research.

In October 2020, the company was rebranded as Zonda Home.

In April 2021, the company acquired BuzzBuzzHome.

References

External links

Publishing companies of the United States
Market research companies of the United States
Publishing companies established in 1976
Privately held companies based in Washington, D.C.
Private equity portfolio companies
1976 establishments in Washington, D.C.
2012 mergers and acquisitions
Oaktree Capital Management